Maksim Shishlov (born 17 February 1996) is a Belarusian professional footballer who plays as a goalkeeper for Polish regional league club Start Rymanów, on loan from Cosmos Nowotaniec.

References

External links 
 
 

1996 births
Living people
Belarusian footballers
Association football goalkeepers
Belarus youth international footballers
FC Neman Grodno players
FC Granit Mikashevichi players
FC Belshina Bobruisk players
FC Slonim-2017 players
FC Slavia Mozyr players
Belarusian Premier League players
Belarusian First League players
IV liga players
Belarusian expatriate footballers
Expatriate footballers in Poland
Belarusian expatriate sportspeople in Poland